The 1986 McDonald's All-American Boys Game was an All-star basketball game played on Sunday, April 11, 1986, at the Joe Louis Arena in Detroit, Michigan. The game's rosters featured the best and most highly recruited high school boys graduating in 1986. The game was the 9th annual version of the McDonald's All-American Game first played in 1978.

1986 game
The game was telecast by ESPN. The East team had many of the top ranked forwards of the 1986 class, including J. R. Reid, who went on to win Mr. Basketball USA; the West team relied on forwards Nick Anderson, Derrick Coleman and Terry Mills, and center Dwayne Schintzius. The protagonists of the 1986 game were East players Rumeal Robinson, a guard who scored 19 points, Steve Hood (16 points) and Reid who won the MVP award (23 points, 8 rebounds); for the West, Derrick Coleman recorded 19 points and 15 rebounds, while Mills scored 20 points along with 5 rebounds. Schintzius and Randall scored 15 points each; Schintzius also had 5 blocks. Of the 25 players, 13 went on to play at least 1 game in the NBA.

East roster

West roster

Coaches
The East team was coached by:
 Head Coach Stewart Vetter, Jr. of Flint Hill School (Oakton, Virginia)

The West team was coached by:
 Head Coach J. E. Evans of Keith High School (Orrville, Alabama)

References

External links
McDonald's All-American on the web
McDonald's All-American all-time rosters
McDonald's All-American rosters at Basketball-Reference.com
Game stats at Realgm.com

1985–86 in American basketball
1986
1986 in sports in Michigan
Basketball competitions in Detroit
1986 in Detroit